Diego Aguirre Parra (born 17 October 1990) is a Spanish footballer who plays as a left winger or left back for CD Numancia.

Club career
Aguirre was born in Toledo, Castilla-La Mancha. He finished his formation in CD Toledo's youth ranks, and made his senior debuts with the reserves in the 2009–10 campaign, playing in the regional leagues.

On 5 December 2010 Aguirre made his first-team debut, coming on as a second-half substitute in a 0–0 draw at Manzanares CF in the Tercera División. He scored his first goal on 9 January of the following year, netting the last of a 4–0 home win against CP Villarrobledo.

On 19 July 2012, after appearing regularly with Toledo and being relegated back to the fourth level, Aguirre signed a new deal with the club. He remained as a starter in the following two campaigns, scoring 13 goals in both seasons combined.

On 11 June 2014 Aguirre signed a three-year deal with La Liga side Rayo Vallecano. He was officially presented on 15 July, along with Derek Boateng.

On 29 August 2014 Aguirre was loaned to CD Leganés, newly promoted to the Segunda División, in a season-long deal. He played his first match as a professional two days later, replacing Carlos Álvarez in the 62nd minute of a 0–2 away loss against UE Llagostera.

On 12 October 2014 Aguirre scored his first professional goal, netting the first in a 1–2 away loss against Sporting de Gijón. On 26 August 2015 he was loaned to Real Oviedo also in the second tier, for one year.

Returning to Rayo in July 2016, Aguirre contributed with three goals in 19 appearances during the 2017–18 campaign as his side achieved a top-tier promotion. On 12 June 2018, he signed a three-year contract with second division side Real Zaragoza.

On 7 June 2019, Zaragoza reached an agreement with Apollon Limassol for the transfer of Aguirre.

Career statistics

Club

Honours
Rayo Vallecano
Segunda División: 2017–18

References

External links

1990 births
Living people
Sportspeople from Toledo, Spain
Spanish footballers
Footballers from Castilla–La Mancha
Association football defenders
Association football wingers
Association football utility players
Segunda División players
Segunda División B players
Tercera División players
CD Toledo players
Rayo Vallecano players
CD Leganés players
Real Oviedo players
Real Zaragoza players
CD Numancia players
Cypriot First Division players
Apollon Limassol FC players
Spanish expatriate footballers
Spanish expatriate sportspeople in Cyprus
Expatriate footballers in Cyprus